Matías Pardo may refer to:

 Matías Pardo (footballer, born 1988), Argentine defender
 Matías Pardo (footballer, born 1995), Argentine midfielder